TeamTO is an independent French animation studio that produces TV series and film projects. Headquartered in Paris, it has a second production facility in Bourg-les-Valence, with offices in Los Angeles, California, U.S., Beijing, China and London, England, United Kingdom. The studio was founded in 2005 by Guillaume Hellouin, Corinne Kouper and Caroline Souris.

Filmography

Animated TV series 
 2008: Zoé Kézako (season 2)
 2009: Hareport
 2010: Babar and the Adventures of Badou
 2010: Angelo Rules
 2010: Oscar's Oasis
 2011: Plankton Invasion
 2015: PJ Masks
 2016: Skylanders Academy
 2016: My Knight and Me
 2019: Mighty Mike
 2019: Ricky Zoom
 2021: City of Ghosts
 2021: Presto! School Of Magic
 2022: The Creature Cases
 2022: Jade Armor
 2023: Hyper Water Park

Animated Shorts 
 2008: Le Dilemme du beurre

Services 
 2010: The Numtums (produced for BBC)
 2011: La Minute du Chat (produced for Salut ça va ?)
 2012: Rabbids Invasion (produced for Ubisoft Film & Television and France Télévisions)
 2014: Calimero (produced for Gaumont Animation)
 2015: Sofia the First (produced for Disney Television Animation, seasons 3–4)
 2016: Elena of Avalor (produced for Disney Television Animation, seasons 2–3)
 2017: Welcome to My Life (produced for Cartoon Network Studios)

Feature films 
 Yellowbird (2014)
 Angelo the Movie (TBA)

Upcoming 

 2023: Flowerville
 2023: Didi’s Music World
 2023: Sophia and her Imagination Box (produced with Brown Bag Films)
 2023: Doki and Doka
 2023: Starlight Stories

In development 
 Joe Giant  (TV series 26x26')
 HeroEEK!
 Take it Easy Mike (Mighty Mike spin-off)

Nominations & Awards

2013

 Angelo Rules, Selection for International emmy Kids Award as Best animated TV series for Kids, USA

References

External links
 

French animation studios